Robert John White, known as John White, is an Ulster Unionist politician in Northern Ireland.

White was Mayor of Coleraine from 1977 to 1980, having been Deputy Mayor from 1973.  He was elected to the council at every election from 1968 to 1993.

In 1996 he was elected to the Northern Ireland Forum for East Londonderry.  He supported the Belfast Agreement in 1998.  In 2006 he succeeded Lord Rogan as UUP President unopposed at the Party AGM.

References

Living people
Year of birth missing (living people)
Mayors of Coleraine
Ulster Unionist Party councillors
Members of the Northern Ireland Forum